Daniel Kokosiński (born 25 July 1985) is a Polish former football defender.

Club career

Polonia Warsaw

Kokosiński started his career with Wisła Płock II.

In June 2009, he moved to the Ekstraklasa side Polonia Warsaw, for a fee of £102.350 . In his first official match for Polonia, in the UEFA Europa League qualifiers, he scored a goal in the 1–0 victory over Juvenus/Dogana. His debut in the Ekstraklasa was less successful, since Polonia was defeated 4–0 by Korona Kielce.

Private life
He is a brother of Błażej Kokosiński (born 20 December 1983, in Raciąż), a Polish former goalkeeper.

References

External links 
 

1985 births
Living people
Polish footballers
Polonia Warsaw players
KTS Weszło Warsaw players
People from Płońsk
Sportspeople from Masovian Voivodeship
Association football forwards
Znicz Pruszków players